Zachariah Lok (1561–1603), of London, was an English politician.

He was a Member of Parliament (MP) for Ipswich in 1593 and Southwark, London in 1601.

References

1561 births
1603 deaths
Politicians from London
English MPs 1593
English MPs 1601
Members of the Parliament of England (pre-1707) for Ipswich